John Keating (2 August 1869 – 8 July 1956) was an Irish politician and farmer. Keating was first elected to Dáil Éireann as a National League Party Teachta Dála (TD) for the Wexford constituency at the June 1927 general election. He lost his seat at the September 1927 general election but was elected as a Cumann na nGaedheal TD at the 1932 general election and was re-elected at the 1933 general election. 

He was elected as a Fine Gael TD at the 1937 and 1938 general elections. He lost his seat at the 1943 general election but was re-elected at the 1944 general election. He stood as an independent candidate at the 1948 general election but did not retain his seat.

He was born at Sarshill, Kilmore in County Wexford, Ireland on 2 August 1869, the second son of Nicholas Keating and Maria Codd Keating. He died on 8 July 1956 and is buried in Grahormick Cemetery, County Wexford.

References

1869 births
1956 deaths
Independent politicians in Ireland
National League Party TDs
Cumann na nGaedheal TDs
Fine Gael TDs
Members of the 5th Dáil
Members of the 7th Dáil
Members of the 8th Dáil
Members of the 9th Dáil
Members of the 10th Dáil
Members of the 12th Dáil
Politicians from County Wexford
Irish farmers